Patrick's test or FABER test is performed to evaluate pathology of the hip joint or the sacroiliac joint.

The test is performed by having the tested leg flexed and the thigh abducted and externally rotated. If pain is elicited on the ipsilateral side anteriorly, it is suggestive of a hip joint disorder on the same side. If pain is elicited on the contralateral side posteriorly around the sacroiliac joint, it is suggestive of pain mediated by dysfunction in that joint.

History
Patrick's test is named after the American neurologist Hugh Talbot Patrick.

See also
 Gaenslen's test
 Physical medicine and rehabilitation

References

Orthopedic surgical procedures